Colonel Richard Lysaght Hare, Viscount Ennismore (20 March 1773 – 24 September 1827) was an Anglo-Irish politician. 

Ennismore was the son of William Hare, 1st Earl of Listowel and Mary, only daughter of Henry Wrixon of Ballygiblin. He sat in the Irish House of Commons as the Member of Parliament for Athy alongside his father from 1798 until the seat's disenfranchisement under the Acts of Union 1800. He subsequently represented Cork County in the UK Parliament as a Tory from 1812 to 1827.

He married Hon. Catherine Dillon, eldest daughter of Robert Dillon, 1st Baron Clonbrock on 10 June 1797 and together they had seven children. Styled The Honourable from 1800, he assumed the courtesy title Viscount Ennismore when his father was made Earl of Listowel in 1822. Ennismore predeceased his father, dying in 1827, meaning his father's titles were inherited by his eldest son, William Hare, 2nd Earl of Listowel.

References

1773 births
1827 deaths
18th-century Anglo-Irish people
19th-century Anglo-Irish people
British courtesy viscounts
Richard
Heirs apparent who never acceded
Irish MPs 1798–1800
Members of the Parliament of Ireland (pre-1801) for County Kildare constituencies
Members of the Parliament of the United Kingdom for County Cork constituencies (1801–1922)
Tory MPs (pre-1834)
UK MPs 1812–1818
UK MPs 1818–1820
UK MPs 1820–1826
UK MPs 1826–1830